Eucalyptus socialis, commonly known as the red mallee, or grey mallee, is a species of mallee that is endemic to inland Australia.

Description
It usually has rough, grey bark on the trunk and smooth dull grey bark that is shed in long ribbons above. Flowering occurs in most months and the flowers are white to pale yellow.

Taxonomy
Eucalyptus socialis was first formally described by Friedrich Anton Wilhelm Miquel in 1856 in the journal Nederlandsch Kruidkundig Archief, from an unpublished description by Ferdinand von Mueller.

The species name socialis a Latin word meaning "friendly", alluding to this species being associated with other eucalypt species as part of mallee communities.

In 2005, Dean Nicolle described four subspecies of E. socialis and the names are accepted by the Australian Plant Census as at December 2019:
 Eucalyptus socialis subsp. eucentrica (L.A.S.Johnson & K.D.Hill) D.Nicolle is distinguished from the other subspecies by the waxy coating on its branchlets and flower buds and by the dull bluish colour of its adult leaves;	
 Eucalyptus socialis F.Muell. ex Miq. subsp. socialis has smaller leaves, buds and fruit than the other subspecies and creamy white flowers;
 Eucalyptus socialis subsp. victoriensis D.Nicolle has larger leaves, flower buds and fruit than the other subspecies and cream to pale yellow flowers;	
 Eucalyptus socialis subsp. viridans D.Nicolle  is mainly distinguished by its green, rather than bluish green leaves.

E. socialis and E. gillii  have undergone extensive hybridisation in parts of the Barrier Range of New South Wales.

Distribution
It is one of the most widespread mallee species in Australia. In Western Australia it is found on calcareous flats and rocky scree slopes in the Pilbara and Goldfields-Esperance regions where it grows in red-grey loam over limestone. It is also found through much of South Australia, particularly in southern areas such as the Eyre Peninsula, Gawler Range, Flinders Ranges and Adelaide foothills where it is common. The range extends into the southern part of the Northern Territory, where it is found in the Alice Springs region and into parts of Queensland where it is found in open woodlands, where it often occurs with E. dumosa, E. gracilis and E. leptophylla.
In New South Wales it is found west from Condoblin with a sporadic distribution from Wilcannia. In these areas it is found in mallee shrubland communities on red aeolian sands.
In Victoria it is found in the north west of the state.

Ecology
Following bushfires the species can resprout basally and has a mortality rate of less than 30% when 100% of leaves are scorched.

Uses
In wheatbelt regions it is also beneficial as the tree will reduce salinity, give shade to stock, act as a windbreak and reduce erosion.

Traditional uses
Indigenous Australians used the tree for making bowls and medicines from the leaves, shields and spears from the bark and obtained water from roots.

Use in horticulture
The plant is sold commercially and is noted for its ability to grow in poor soils. It is very attractive to bees and butterflies who use the nectar for food from spring to summer during flowering. It is drought- and salt-tolerant and will grow in full sun in well-drained soils. It is slow-growing but used in revegetation projects and as a small garden tree.

See also
List of Eucalyptus species

References

socialis
Myrtales of Australia
Eucalypts of Western Australia
Flora of New South Wales
Flora of South Australia
Flora of Queensland
Flora of Victoria (Australia)
Plants described in 1856
Mallees (habit)
Taxa named by Ferdinand von Mueller